National Hero of Indonesia is the highest-level title awarded in Indonesia. It is posthumously given by the Government of Indonesia for actions which are deemed to be heroic, defined as "actual deeds which can be remembered and exemplified for all time by other citizens" or "extraordinary service furthering the interests of the state and people". The Ministry of Social Affairs gives seven criteria which an individual must fulfill, as follows:
Have been an Indonesian citizen who is deceased and, during his lifetime, led an armed struggle or produced a concept or product useful to the state;
Have continued the struggle throughout his life and performed above and beyond the call of duty;
Have had a wide-reaching impact through his actions;
Have shown a high degree of nationalism;
Have been of good moral standing and respectable character;
Never surrendered to his enemies; and
Never committed an act which taints his or her legacy.

Nominations undergo a four-step process and must be approved at each level. A proposal is made by the general populace in a city or regency to the mayor or regent, who must then make a request to the province's governor. The governor then makes a recommendation to the Ministry of Social Affairs, which forwards it to the president, represented by the Board of Titles; this board consists of two academics, two persons of a military background, and three persons who have previously received an award or title. Those selected by the president, as represented by the Board, are awarded the title at a ceremony in the Indonesian capital of Jakarta. Since 2000, the ceremony has occurred in early November, coinciding with Indonesia's Heroes' Day.

The legal framework for the title, initially styled National Independence Hero, was established with the release of Presidential Decree No. 241 of 1958. The title was first awarded on 30 August 1959 to the politician turned writer Abdul Muis, who had died the previous month. This title was used for the rest of Sukarno's rule. When Suharto rose to power in the mid-1960s, the title was given its current name. Special titles at the level of National Hero have also been awarded. Hero of the Revolution was given in 1965 to ten victims of the 30 September Movement that resulted in end of Sukarno reign, while Sukarno and former vice-president Mohammad Hatta were given the title Proclamation Heroes in 1988 for their role in reading the Proclamation of Indonesian Independence.

A total of 185 men and 15 women have been deemed national heroes, most recently Soeharto Sastrosoeyoso, Paku Alam VIII, Rubini Natawisastra, Salahuddin bin Talibuddin and Ahmad Sanusi in 2022. These heroes have come from all parts of the Indonesian archipelago, from Aceh in the west to Papua in the east. They represent numerous ethnicities, including native Indonesians, ethnic Chinese, Arabs and Eurasians. They include prime ministers, guerrillas, government ministers, soldiers, royalty, journalists, and a bishop.

The following list is initially presented in alphabetical order; owing to differing cultural naming conventions, not all entries are sorted by last name. The list is further sortable by year of birth, death, and recognition. Names are standardised using the Indonesian Spelling System and thus may not reflect the original spelling.


National Heroes of Indonesia

Explanatory notes

Footnotes

Works cited

 

 
 

 
 

 
 

 
 
 
 
 
 
 
 
 

 
Lists of award winners
Lists of Indonesian people
Hero (title)